The 2000–2001 season was Liverpool Football Club's 109th season in existence and their 39th consecutive season in the top-flight of English football. This season proved highly successful for Liverpool, with them picking up the League Cup, UEFA Cup and FA Cup under Gerard Houllier, having finished 3rd in the league.

Season summary
Liverpool enjoyed their best season for years when they completed a unique treble of cup competitions and ended Gérard Houllier's three-year wait to bring silverware to Anfield. 

The first trophy was secured on 25 February when a 5–4 penalty shoot-out victory followed a 1–1 draw with Birmingham City in the Worthington Cup final. The game was also the first club fixture to be played at Cardiff's Millennium Stadium while Wembley was being rebuilt. Part two of the treble was completed on 12 May when two late Michael Owen goals overturned Arsenal's lead in the FA Cup Final to give the Reds a 2–1 win. The final part of the treble was perhaps the most dramatic. The UEFA Cup final featured an amazing nine goals as Alavés gave them a run for their money fighting back to equalize from 3–1 and 4–3, before Liverpool finally ran out 5–4 winners after extra-time. The FA and UEFA cup wins meant Liverpool played in the Charity Shield and UEFA Super Cup at the start of the next season, winning both.

Promising young midfielder Steven Gerrard was voted PFA Young Player of the Year for his key part in one of the most successful season's in Liverpool's 109-year history, and contributions from British stars Michael Owen, Robbie Fowler, Jamie Carragher, Danny Murphy and new signings Gary McAllister and Emile Heskey were matched by an increasingly continental side consisting of new captain Sami Hyypiä, Sander Westerveld, Jari Litmanen and Dietmar Hamann.

However, there was sad news just after the end of the season, when former manager Joe Fagan (manager of the 1984 side that also managed to win three trophies in a season) died at the age of 80 after a long illness.

Players

First-team squad

Transfers

In

Out

Events of the season

August
Gérard Houllier prepared for his third season at the Liverpool helm, looking to improve on the fourth-place finish of the previous campaign which had seen the Reds having to settle for a place in the UEFA Cup when they had come so close to qualifying for the UEFA Champions League.

The campaign began with a 1–0 home win over relegation favourites Bradford City, who had defeated Liverpool last season to deny the Reds Champions League qualification; Emile Heskey scored the only goal of the game. A 2–0 defeat at Arsenal followed, before a thrilling 3–3 draw at Southampton in which Michael Owen was on target twice.

September
September began well with good home wins over Aston Villa and Manchester City. The European adventure then began with a 1–0 away win over Romanian side Rapid București in the first round first leg of the UEFA Cup. The return to league action saw 1–1 draws with West Ham United and Sunderland. The month ended with a goalless home draw in the return leg against Rapid București to ensure progression to the next stage of the competition.

October
October began badly for Liverpool, who found themselves on the receiving end of a 3–0 defeat by Chelsea in the league. Two weeks later, however, an Emile Heskey hat-trick gave them a 4–0 win at Derby County which put them in fourth place, four points behind leaders Manchester United and second placed Arsenal and a point behind third placed Leicester City. Heskey was on target in the next two games that month – a 1–0 win over Slovan Liberec in the UEFA Cup second round first leg at Anfield and the 3–1 win over Everton in the Merseyside derby, also at Anfield.

November
November brought mixed results for the Reds. Their Football League Cup quest began in the third round with a 2–1 win over Chelsea after extra time. This was followed by a 4–3 league defeat to Leeds United at Elland Road. In the second round second leg of the UEFA Cup, the Reds eliminated Slovan Liberec to reach the third round. There was also an impressive 4–1 home win over Coventry City in the league, followed by 2–1 defeats at Tottenham Hotspur and Newcastle United, and finally an 8–0 away demolition of Division Two side Stoke City in the fourth round of the League Cup. Liverpool were still a healthy fifth in the league but were now 12 points adrift of leaders Manchester United, in turn eight points ahead of nearest contenders Arsenal.

December
December was a generally good month for the Reds, who began with a 3–0 home win over Charlton Athletic before overcoming Olympiacos in the UEFA Cup third round. Liverpool then suffering a shock 1–0 home defeat at the hands of surprise title outsiders Ipswich Town, only promoted the previous season. A Danny Murphy goal gave them a 1–0 away win over Manchester United two days before Christmas, though it did little to alter the decision of many bookmakers by this stage of the season to re-open the books on the title race, as so many of them were now certain that United would win their third successive title. The year ended with a 1–0 defeat to Middlesbrough at the Riverside Stadium on Boxing Day. The Reds ended the year in sixth place, occupying the European places along with leaders Manchester United, and the top five clubs Arsenal, Sunderland, Leicester City and Ipswich Town.

January
2001 started with a 2–1 home win over Southampton, followed by a 3–0 home win over Rotherham United in the FA Cup third round. Then came a surprise 2–1 defeat by Division One strugglers Crystal Palace in the League Cup semi-final first leg at Selhurst Park, though the Reds were rampant 5-0 winners in the return leg at Anfield 14 days later to book their place in the final with Birmingham City and be presented with the opportunity to win the trophy for a record sixth time. There was also an excellent 3–0 away win over Aston Villa in the league in mid January, as well as a 2–0 win at Leeds United in the FA Cup fourth round. The month ended with a 1–1 draw against strugglers Manchester City at Maine Road. Liverpool now stood fourth in the league, with Manchester United now 15 points ahead of nearest contenders Arsenal, 16 points clear of third placed Sunderland and 18 points clear of Liverpool. Though the league was now surely beyond Liverpool's (and indeed any other team's) reach, the Reds still had three cups to play for.

February
February began with an impressive 3–0 home win over struggling West Ham United and a 1–1 draw at Sunderland. Then came the return to European action – a 2–0 away win over Roma in the UEFA Cup fourth round, in which Michael Owen scored both goals. Then came a 4–2 home win over Manchester City in the FA Cup fifth round. Then came the second leg of the game against Roma, which the Reds lost 1–0 at Anfield, still enough for Liverpool to progress to the quarter-finals.

The League Cup final on 25 February was to be the first domestic cup final to be playing beyond England's borders: Wembley Stadium had closed for rebuilding in October 2000 and, until the revamped stadium was ready, all major finals in English football would be held at the Millennium Stadium in Cardiff, Wales. Robbie Fowler put the Reds ahead against Birmingham City after 30 minutes, only for the Division One midlanders to equalise later. With extra time played, the scores were still level and so the game went to penalties – a first for an English cup final. Liverpool won the shoot-out to end their six-year wait for a major trophy, their longest major trophy wait since the early 1960s.

March
Liverpool began March with a 2–0 defeat at Leicester City before travelling to Portugal for the UEFA Cup quarter final first leg with Porto, which ended in a goalless draw. Then came the all-Merseyside FA Cup quarter-final – not against Everton, but against Wirral-based Tranmere Rovers, managed by former Liverpool striker John Aldridge. The Reds won 4–2 at Prenton Park, marking the end of a complicated story for Tranmere, who were on their way to relegation from Division One – and for Aldridge, who left the club within weeks of this game. Four days later, Porto travelled to Anfield for the quarter-final second leg, which the Reds won 2–0. The remaining games that month were a 1–1 home draw with struggling Derby County and a 2–0 home win over Manchester United, which did little except prolong United's wait for their inevitable third straight league title.

April
With Manchester United confirmed as Premier League champions on 14 April, most eyes were off the Premier League as Liverpool looked to add the FA Cup and UEFA Cup to their earlier League Cup triumph. The FA Cup semi-final at Villa Park on 8 April was against Division Two surprise package Wycombe Wanderers (in only their eighth season as a Football League club) and the Reds only narrowly managed to beat them with a slender 2–1 win. The UEFA Cup semi final first leg with Barcelona saw a goalless draw at the Camp Nou, before a penalty by 36-year-old Gary McAllister in the return leg at Anfield put the Reds through to their first post-Heysel European final.

May
After securing a third-place finish in the league and qualification for the Champions League for the first time in the post-Heysel era, the Reds enjoyed one of their finest months ever by completing a unique treble of the League Cup (won in late February), FA Cup and UEFA Cup. The FA Cup was snatched from the jaws of defeat when two late goals from Michael Owen overturned Arsenal's 1–0 lead in the final minutes of the game. The treble was completed four days later when a thrilling match against Alavés of Spain gave them a 5–4 victory in the UEFA Cup final.

Results

Pre-season and friendlies

Premier League

League table

Results by round

Matches

League Cup

FA Cup

UEFA Cup

First round

Second round

Third round

Fourth round

Quarter-finals

Semi-finals

Final

Statistics

Player statistics

Goalscorers
Includes all competitive matches.

Competition top scorers

References

Notes

External links
LFChistory.net

Liverpool F.C. seasons
Liverpool
UEFA Europa League-winning seasons